"Jum" Hubert Sydney Turtill (1 February 1880 – 9 April 1918) was a New Zealand dual-code footballer, playing rugby union and then rugby league for New Zealand. After emigrating to Britain, he served in the British Army during the First World War, and was killed while serving in 1918.

Early years
Turtill's father died in London when he was only three years old and his mother decided to move to New Zealand to be with relatives. On the sea voyage in 1884 he gained the nickname Jum, short for Jumbo. Turtill worked in New Zealand as a decorative metal worker.

Rugby union
He started his rugby union career playing for Christchurch Albion before making the Canterbury team in 1902. He represented the South Island in 1903 and 1907. He became an All Black in 1905, playing against Australia.

Rugby league
In 1907 he joined the professional All Blacksbetter known as the All Goldson their tour of Great Britain and Australia, thus joining the code that would evolve into rugby league. He was selected because he was considered well versed in wet weather football, something the side would constantly experience in Great Britain. On the tour he played in six test matches.  Turtill captained the side in the first ever trans-Tasman test against the Australia national rugby league team on 9 May 1908 when New Zealand won 11-10. Turtill only scored one try on tour, but it was an important one - the first by New Zealand in a test match against Great Britain at Leeds on 25 January 1908 - and helped them win the series.

Once the tour was over he returned to England with his wife, Mabel, originally intending to play for Salford. However he instead joined St. Helens where he also owned a pub, the "Lord Nelson Hotel" in St Helens.

First World War
After the outbreak of the First World War, Turtill served with the British Army. He became a sergeant in the Royal Engineers until he was killed in France in 1918 during the Battle of Givenchy.

Turtill’s body was buried in a French war cemetery.

In 2022 the New Zealand Rugby Museum displayed a tribute to Turtill, including items on loan from his family including his Canterbury cap and New Zealand jersey and cap and his engraved war service medallion.

See also
 List of international rugby union players killed in World War I

References

External links

St Helens Heritage Society profile

1880 births
1918 deaths
British Army personnel of World War I
British military personnel killed in World War I
Canterbury rugby union players
Dual-code rugby internationals
English emigrants to New Zealand
New Zealand international rugby union players
New Zealand national rugby league team captains
New Zealand national rugby league team players
New Zealand rugby league players
New Zealand rugby union players
Publicans
Royal Engineers soldiers
Rugby league fullbacks
Rugby league players from London
Rugby union players from London
South Island rugby union players
St Helens R.F.C. players